Apollo/Domain was a range of workstations developed and produced by Apollo Computer from circa 1980 to 1989. The machines were built around the Motorola 68k family of processors, except for the DN10000, which had from one to four of Apollo's RISC processors, named PRISM.

Operating system
The original operating system was Apollo's own product called Aegis, which was later renamed to Domain/OS. The Aegis and Domain/OS system offered advanced features for the time, for example an object oriented filesystem, network transparency, diskless booting, a graphical user interface and, in Domain/OS, interoperability with BSD, System V and POSIX.

Hardware
An Apollo workstation resembled a modern PC, with base unit, keyboard, mouse, and screen. Early models were housed in  short (about 2 ft high) 19" rack cabinets that would be set beside a desk or under a table.  The DN300 and later DN330 were designed as integrated units with system and monitor in one unit and fit easily on a desk.  Every Apollo system (even standalones) had to include at least one network interface.  Originally the only option was the 12 Mbit/s Apollo Token Ring (ATR).  Over time, 10 Mbit/s Ethernet was added as an option. It has been stated that the IBM Token Ring was an option - this was never available. The ATR was generally the best choice, since it was extremely scalable; whilst the Ethernet of the time suffered serious performance loss as extra machines were added to the network, this was not true of ATR, which could easily have over a hundred machines on one network. One drawback was that, unlike Ethernet, one machine failure (which could easily happen given a single faulty connector) stopped the entire network. For this reason, Apollo provided an optional (but strongly recommended) network cabling system of bypass switches and quick connect boxes which allowed machines to be disconnected and moved without problems. Apollo Token Ring networks used 75 ohm RG-6U coaxial cabling.

Networking
The network orientation of the systems, together with the ATR functionality, made it easy and practicable to boot and run diskless machines using another machine's OS. In principle, as many machines could be booted from one host as it could cope with; in practice, four diskless machines from one host was about the limit. Provided the correct machine-specific software was installed on the host (again, very easy), any type of machine could be booted from any other (one complication being that a DN10000 could only be booted from another DN10000 or a 68K-based system which had "cmpexe" compound executables installed).

Some systems could have the graphics card removed so that they could be used as a servers; in such a case the keyboard and mouse were automatically ignored, and the system accessed either across the network, or via a dumb terminal plugged into the machine's serial port. Such a system was designated "DSP" instead of "DN".

Models
The model naming convention was DN (for Domain Node) with a model number.  If the system had no display, it was a DSP (for Domain Service Processor).

The first model was the DN416 workstation, later referred to as the DN100 after the green screen was substituted with a black and white screen.  This system used two 68000 processors and implemented virtual memory (which the 68000 wasn't theoretically capable of) by stopping one processor when there was a page fault and having the other processor handle the fault, then release the primary processor when the page fault was handled.

Later models were based on 68010, 68020, 68030 and 68040 processors which had native support for virtual memory.  Some workstations had bit-slice CPU implementations that were instruction set compatible with the 68000.

The DSP90 was a fileserver built using a standard Multibus backplane and I/O controllers.  The disk controller could support up to four (4) 500MB hard drives.  A 9-track tape controller was also available.

Early performance models were the DN560 and DN660 which were housed in desk-side cabinets.  These would commonly have color graphics cards with graphics accelerators.

The DN300 and later DN330 were integrated desktop systems not much bigger than the included monitor.

In the late 1980s, Apollo introduced a new pair of machines.  The DN3000 and DN4000 used 68020 processors, but were housed in IBM PC style cases of the time and had IBM-AT compatible ISA expansion slots and PC-compatible disk drives.  These became the mainstay of the Apollo range in the mid to late 1980s.  In principle, a user or third party could install a standard AT expansion card, but since this required the writing of a special device driver, in practice this was very rare. However, the size and design of the boxes made installing or replacing components very easy. A typical system could have between 2 MiB and 32 MiB of memory, a 76 MB, 150 MB or 330 MB (very occasionally 660 MB) hard disk, and 32-bit 68020 or 68030 processor running at 12 MHz to 33 MHz, depending on model. A half-height expansion bay could take either a 5¼-inch floppy disk drive or a QIC-type cartridge tape drive, capacity 30 MB, 45 MB, or 60 MB depending on cartridge. For printer access, the system came with a serial port as standard; a serial/parallel expansion card could provide a parallel printer port if this was required.

The DN3000 and DN4000 were later upgraded to DN3500 and DN4500 with a faster 68030 CPU.  The DN3500 was approximately as powerful as the DN4000.  A DN5500 with a 68040 was also produced in limited quantities.

A DN2500 workstation was released which was advertised as "4 Mips, 4 MB of memory, for under $4,000".  This was a single integrated motherboard that used PC standard DRAM DIMM modules.  This was a significant departure from previous designs and those of the competition which had custom memory modules.  The motherboard included a high resolution (1280x1024) black and white bitmapped display and SCSI disk interface.  The systems included a single AT expansion slot for a network card to allow the system to attach to any of the three supported networks (Apollo Token Ring, IBM Token Ring, or Ethernet)

After the purchase of Apollo Computer by HP, a merged line of workstations that could run either Domain/OS or HP-UX was produced with the name HP/Apollo 425t and HP/Apollo 433s.  The 425t was a "pizza box" design with a single network expansion slot.  The 433s was a desk-side server systems with multiple expansion slots.

Compatibility
PC compatibility was possible either through software emulation, using the optional product DPCE, or through a plug-in card carrying an Intel 80286 processor.  A third-party plug-in card with a 386 was also available.

An Apollo Token Ring network card could also be placed in a standard PC and network drivers allowed it to connect to a server running a PC SMB (Server Message Block) file server.

Usage
Although Apollo systems were easy to use and administer, they became less cost-effective because the proprietary operating system made software more expensive than Unix software. The 68K processors were slower than the new RISC chips from Sun and Hewlett-Packard. Apollo addressed both problems by introducing the RISC-based DN10000 and Unix-friendly Domain/OS operating system. However, the DN10000, though fast, was extremely expensive, and a reliable version of Domain/OS came too late to make a difference. The increased speed and falling price of PCs ensured the obsolescence of high end systems such as Apollo workstations.

Acquisition
In 1989, Hewlett-Packard acquired Apollo. They later released the DN2500 series workstation, a cheap alternative to the DN3x00/4x00 series, and later still the HP 9000 Series 400 line, which could run either HP's own flavor of Unix, HP-UX, or Domain/OS. In this case, the choice had to be made at time of purchase, partly because HP-UX and Domain/OS functionality required different keyboards and mice.

References

External links
 Apollo Frequently Asked Questions

68k-based computers
Computer workstations
Diskless workstations